Luke Taylor (born 15 September 1994) is an English field hockey player who plays as a defender for Surbiton and the  England and Great Britain national teams.

He was educated at Whitgift School.

Club career
Taylor plays club hockey in the Men's England Hockey League Premier Division for Surbiton.

He has also played club hockey for Loughborough Students and  East Grinstead.

International career
He made his senior debut for England in August 2017 against the Netherlands, in Spain. He played for England U21 at the Junior World Cup in 2013 and won a European Championships U21 bronze medal in 2014. He captained GB U21s to success in the Sultan of Johor Cup, in October 2015, finishing as the competition’s top-scorer.

References

External links
Profile on England Hockey
Profile on Great Britain Hockey

1994 births
Living people
English male field hockey players
Male field hockey defenders
2018 Men's Hockey World Cup players
East Grinstead Hockey Club players
Surbiton Hockey Club players
Loughborough Students field hockey players
Men's England Hockey League players